Agustín Gabriel de Montiano y Luyando (28 February 1697 – 1 November 1764) was a Spanish dramatist whose work is linked to Neoclassicism. He was a member of the Royal Spanish Academy and was also a noted historian; he founded the Real Academia de la Historia in 1735 and became its first director. He was a Secretary of "Cámara de Gracia y Justicia y Estado" (some sort of Spanish High Court of Justice and King Council).

Early life
He was a brother of Manuel de Montiano, Lieutenant General of the Royal Spanish Army, a defender in 1738 of the attacks by the English Crown to the Florida Peninsula, held by the Spaniards since the first half of the 16th century and later sold to the United States in the 19th century by the Spanish Crown.

Montiano was born in Valladolid.  Orphaned in childhood, he was protected then by his uncle Francisco de Montiano, "Ministro de la Audiencia de Aragón", in Zaragoza,  (some sort of High Court of Law for the former Kingdom of Aragón subjects), learning Jurisprudence with famed Ecclesiastical Law and History Blas Antonio Nasarre, but both, uncle and nephew have to abandon the town to go back to Valladolid because of the battles between the would-be rulers of Spain during the Spanish Succession War, Felipe V of Spain and the Pretender Archduke Carlos de Austria, but instead of, eventually, seek the protection of the Archbishop of Salamanca, the conquest of Majorca by Felipe V troops led to his uncle being sent as a "Presidente de la Audiencia" to Majorca.

Life
While in Majorca, they created some sort of literary academy with the assistance, apparently, of the "Count of Mahon and Colonel of the Dragoon's Regiment of Edinburgh", (???), writing an Opera in 1719, "La Lira de Orfeo" and a poem in octosyllabes named "El robo de Dina" in 1727.

In 1727, uncle and nephew were appointed residents in Madrid, his uncle being "Fiscal of the Exchequer Council" and later "Fiscal of The High Court of Law". On his uncle death he went to Seville, where, already seriously mentally ill King Felipe V of Spain, was living.

His deep knowledge of law, French and Italian called the attention of the then powerful PM José Patiño, o (Milano, Italy, 11 April 1666 – 3 November 1736), being promoted to Secretary of the English – Spanish political meetings and truces being discussed there.

In 1734 he married María Josefa Manrique, daughter of General Field Marshal Diego Antonio Manrique, close friend of the Queen Consort and in 1735 he was invested in Madrid "Primer Secretario del Despacho Universal de Estado", (something like the Privy Royal Spanish Council), and on 6 March 1737 he became a Member of the Royal Spanish Academy, becoming a Director on 27 April 1738, publishing in 1739, "Cotejo de la Conducta de S. M. con la del Rey Británico", which could be translated as "A comparison of the behavior of His Majesty against (the behavior) of the British King".

The ailing finances of the Society of History he founded and led came in danger of the eventual closing in 1744 as discussed by Montiano himself and, mercifully, on 25 October 1744, the already seriously mentally deteriorated King "gave notice" of his Royal Approval. No money was however available through the Spanish Military Efforts of those years in Poland, England, Austria and Italy, but in July 1745 Montiano was appointed "Perpetual Director of the Academy", for his lifetime and stressing the exceptional circumstances of this "lifetime" appointment, never to be repeated in the future.

Towards those dates he was a firm protector in Madrid of his young nephew Eugenio de Llaguno y Amírola, (Menagarai, Alava, 1724–????),  later notorious political and intellectual Basque residing in Madrid.( See for instance: :es:Menagarai :es:Eugenio de Llaguno y Amírola)

In 1750 and 1753, he published two books that attempted to demonstrate how the structural unity of Greek tragedies has been used consistently by leading 16th-century writers.

He was elected a member of the Imperial Academy of Sciences of Saint Petersburg, Russia, on 29 October 1759 by the President of the academy, Kiril Razumoski, a powerful ancestor of one of Ludwig van Beethoven's patrons, Prince Andrey Razumovsky.

He maintained literary correspondence with Louis Racine, (Paris, 6 November 1692 – 29 January 1763), the second son of the important French dramatist Jean Racine (22 December 1639 – 21 April 1699), and with Jean Fitou du Tillet, an author of "The French Parnasse".

References 

 G. TIRRY y TIRRY, (Marqués de la Cañada) : Elogio fúnebre de Don Agustín de Montiano", (1765), 27 pages.
 Elogio de Don Agustín de Montiano y Luyando, Primer Director de la Academia de la Historia, leído ante la misma por Don Lorenzo Diéguez y Ramirez de Arellano, Nota: Edición digital a partir de Boletín de la Real Academia de la Historia, tomo 34 (1899), pp. 351–361.
 http://descargas.cervantesvirtual.com/servlet/SirveObras/hist/03693874380358562979079/023206.pdf?incr=1
 CANDIDO MARIA TRIGUEROS, Elogio Histórico de Don Agustín de Montiano y Luyando y Juicio Critico de sus Obras, Memorias de la Academia Sevillana de Buenas Letras, II, (1843), pages 69 – 94.
 F. UHAGON, MARQUÉS de LAURENCÍN : Don Agustín Montiano y Luyando, primer Director de la Real Academia de la Historia'', Madrid, (1926), 369 pages.
 Article in Spanish on Montiano y Luyando, Wikipedia

1697 births
1764 deaths
Writers from Valladolid
Spanish dramatists and playwrights
Spanish male dramatists and playwrights
18th-century Spanish historians
Members of the Royal Spanish Academy